Somalia is a federal republic consisting of six federal states, including Banaadir regional administration. Somalia is further subdivided into 18 administrative regions (gobollada, singular gobol), which are in turn subdivided into districts.

History 
Puntland is a federal state in the northeast of Somalia Galmudug is a federal state in central Somalia. Jubaland is a federal state in the south of Somalia. In November 2014, the South West State of Somalia was established as a Somali federal state. In October 2016, a formation conference was launched in order to form the Hirshabelle State as a Somali federal state.

The Federal Parliament is tasked with selecting the ultimate number and boundaries of the autonomous regional states (officially, Federal Member States) within the Federal Republic of Somalia. To this end, the legislature in December 2014 passed a law establishing the Boundary and Federalization Commission. The body is mandated with determining the boundaries of the country's constituent Federal Member States, as well as arbitrating between these regional states on their respective jurisdiction.

Federal member states

As of 2016, Somalia is officially divided into 6 federal member states, including the claimed but uncontrolled Somaliland:

Galmudug
Hirshabelle
Jubaland
Puntland
South West
Somaliland

Regions

	
President of Somalia Mohamed Siad Barre established five of these regions in 1974–75 for political reasons: Middle Juba, Lower Juba, Gedo, Bay, and Bakool; Banaadir shrank to Mogadishu city only at the same time.

Below are the regions of Somalia, along with their capitals shown in parentheses:

 Bakool (Hudur)
 Banadir (Mogadishu)
 Bari (Bosaso)
 Bay (Baidoa)
 Galgaduud (Dhusamareb)
 Gedo (Garbahaarreey)
 Hiiraan (Beledweyn)
 Lower Juba (Kismayo)
 Lower Shabelle (Merca) – established in 1984
 Middle Juba (Bu'ale)
 Middle Shebelle (Jowhar) 
 Mudug (Galkayo)
 Nugal (Garowe)
 Maroodi-jeh (Hargeisa)
 Awdal (Boorama)
 Togdheer (Burco) 
 Sool (Laascanood)
 Sanaag (Erigavo)

See also

Administrative divisions of Somalia
List of regions of Somalia by Human Development Index

References 

 
 
Subdivisions of Somalia
Somalia, States and regions
Somalia geography-related lists